The Brown County Veterans Memorial Arena (more commonly known as the Brown County Arena) was a 5,248-seat multi-purpose arena in Ashwaubenon, Wisconsin, situated on the corner of Lombardi Avenue and Oneida Street, across from Lambeau Field. The arena opened on November 11, 1958. The final event held at the arena was a Bret Michaels concert on April 6, 2019. The building, along with neighboring Shopko Hall, was replaced by a new exposition center, Resch Expo, in 2021. Demolition of the arena began April 30, 2019.

History
The arena was dedicated in honor of the county's World War II veterans. The arena was the first large venue in the city (expanding on the Riverside Ballroom's small capacity), allowing large entertainment acts to come to Green Bay, as Lambeau Field and the Packers have been historically adverse to allowing other events in their stadium (only starting to do so in the 2010s) to protect its field surface. It was the city and county's main indoor venue until the Resch Center opened in 2002. The Green Bay Packers Hall of Fame was first established inside the Brown County Arena as a small exhibit on a wall.

Events
The arena hosted a breakfast for John F. Kennedy in 1960.

Elvis Presley gave a performance at the arena on April 28, 1977. He would die 4 months after the show on August 16.

It was the home arena for the University of Wisconsin–Green Bay basketball teams.

It hosted the 1991 Mid-Continent Conference (now Summit League) men's basketball tournament and the Midwestern Collegiate Conference (now Horizon League) men's basketball tournament in 1998.

The Arena continued to play host to concerts, ice shows, local sporting shows, high school graduations, and other events but was largely phased out as a sports arena, because of its age and an older seating layout. Most area sports teams that once used the arena now play home games in the newer Resch Center next door, while some higher-tier concerts moved to the Weidner Center on the University of Wisconsin–Green Bay campus. In its waning years, it continued to be used as an overflow site for some matches.

Brown County Arena played host to several WWF events in the 1980s and resuming again in the early 2000s, with house shows.

Pro wrestling
Throughout the 1980s and 1990s, the World Wrestling Federation would hold live events as well as WWF TV tapings in the arena.  WCW would also go on to have many live events at the arena.  In 1998 the WWF took a three-year hiatus from the Brown County Arena.  In January 2001 and in February 2002, the World Wrestling Federation returned with two house shows before leaving their older location for the brand new Resch Center.

The XWF held three live, house show type events in their first-ever tour outside of the original tapings that took place at Universal Studios in Orlando, Florida.  These events occurred in December 2001.  One of the venues the XWF ran was the Brown County Arena.  The other stops on the tour included Hammond Indiana and Milwaukee Wisconsin.

Despite being an unknown company to nearly all who attended the XWF in Your Face House drew a large crowd with legends such as, Curt Hennig, The Road Warriors, the Nasty Boys and Rowdy Roddy Piper along with younger talent left over from the WWF's acquisition of WCW, including Vampiro, Buff Bagwell, and Norman Smiley. BCA also hosted AWA Wrestling before going out of business.

Final concert and closure
A final concert was held at the arena on April 6, 2019 featuring Brett Michaels. Michaels was the lead singer of Poison, and the group's first video for the song "Every Rose Has Its Thorn" was filmed at the venue. The band started every one of their world tours here. Michaels was selected as the final act because he opened more tours at the arena than anyone else. The concert had a Nostalgia theme and it utilized canned lighting. A remake video for the song was filmed at the final concert.

A closing ceremony was held starting at noon on Monday, April 29, 2019. After the ceremony, county residents were allowed to take two free seats or purchase a four-seat bench for $50.

See also
Shopko Hall

References

External links 

 Official Website
 Brown County Veterans Memorial Arena - PMI Entertainment Group

Defunct college basketball venues in the United States
Tourist attractions in Brown County, Wisconsin
Sports venues demolished in 2019
2019 disestablishments in Wisconsin
1958 establishments in Wisconsin
Green Bay Phoenix basketball venues
Defunct indoor arenas in Wisconsin
Sports venues completed in 1958
Sports venues in Green Bay, Wisconsin